The 2019 World RX of Norway was the fifth round of the sixth season of the FIA World Rallycross Championship. The event was held at the Lånkebanen near Hell, Nord-Trøndelag.

Supercar 

Source

Heats 

 Note: Anton Marklund was disqualified (after the race) from the whole event for a technical infringement.

Semi-finals 

 Semi-Final 1

 Semi-Final 2

Final

Standings after the event 

Source

 Note: Only the top five positions are included.

References 

|- style="text-align:center"
|width="35%"|Previous race:2019 World RX of Great Britain
|width="40%"|FIA World Rallycross Championship2019 season
|width="35%"|Next race:2019 World RX of Sweden
|- style="text-align:center"
|width="35%"|Previous race:2018 World RX of Norway
|width="40%"|World RX of Norway
|width="35%"|Next race:2022 World RX of Norway
|- style="text-align:center"

Norway
World RX
2019 in Norwegian sport